Koothrapally is a village in Kottayam district of Kerala, India.

Misompady Hamlet
Misompady is a place in Koothrapally village,  located at Kottayam District in Kerala state.

Saint Maurus
Koothrappally village is famous for the  Church- "St; Mary's church". This is because there is saint named St Maurus.

Festivals
The people conduct feast of St Maurus on 9 January.

References

Villages in Kottayam district